A constitutional referendum was held in American Samoa on 4 November 2014. The proposed amendment to the constitution would have allowed the Fono to override vetoes by the Governor.

Background
The proposal amendment to the constitution would have allowed the Fono to override vetoes issued by the Governor by a two-thirds majority vote in cases where the Governor rejected legislation that had been passed twice by the Fono. It was approved by the Senate on 18 February 2014, and was supported by Governor Lolo Letalu Matalasi Moliga. As it involved amending the constitution, the proposal would have also needed approval from the United States Congress.

Results

References

2014 referendums
2014 American Samoa elections

Constitutional referendums in American Samoa